Painted Sky is a live album by Acoustic Strawbs.

Track listing
"Oh How She Changed" (Dave Cousins, Tony Hooper)
"Autumn"
"Heroine's Theme" (John Hawken)
"Deep Summer Sleep" (Cousins)
"The Winter Long" (Cousins)
"Cold Steel" (Dave Lambert)
"New World" (Cousins)
"The Antique Suite" (Cousins)
"The Reaper"
"We Must Cross the River"
"Antiques and Curios"
"Hey It's Been a Long Time"
"Hard Hard Winter" (Cousins, Robert Kirby)
"Midnight Sun" (Chas Cronk, Cousins)
"Grace Darling" (Cousins)
"If" (Cousins)
"Hero and Heroine" (Cousins)

Personnel
Dave Cousins – lead vocals, backing vocals, acoustic guitar, dulcimer, banjo
Dave Lambert – lead vocals, backing vocals, acoustic guitar
Chas Cronk – acoustic bass guitar, acoustic guitar, bass pedals, vocals

Recording
Recorded live at Painted Sky Studios, Cambria, California.

Steve Crimmel – producer, engineer

Release history

References
Painted Sky on Strawbsweb

Notes

2005 live albums
Strawbs live albums